His Majesty's hired armed cutter Norfolk, of eight guns, served the Royal Navy from 1807 to 1812. This Norfolk is not the armed defense ship .

Citations and references
Citations

References
  

1800s ships
Hired armed vessels of the Royal Navy